Rikki-Tikki-Tavi is a 1975 Soviet-Indian family film directed by Nana Kldiashvili and Aleksandr Zguridi.

Plot 
The film takes place in the jungle of India. A forester Robert Lawson lives there, and his son Teddy walks, swims, and watches various animals with his boy John. Suddenly a thunderstorm begins and the boys are hiding near the shore. Before their eyes, the rapid current carries away animals, including the mongoose, which Teddy rushed to save.

Cast 
 Igor Alekseyev	
 Vera Altayskaya
 Aleksey Batalov
 Irina Kartashyova
 Andrey Mironov
 S.K. Puri	
 Yury Puzyryov
 S. Suri
 Margarita Terekhova
 Vasiliy Vasilev
 S. Vishnu

References

External links 
 

1975 films
1970s Russian-language films
1970s Hindi-language films
1975 multilingual films
Indian multilingual films
Soviet multilingual films
Indian children's films
The Jungle Book films